ABC Artists’ Books Cooperative is an international network created by and for artists who make print-on-demand books. Founded in 2009 by German artist Joachim Schmid, the cooperative participates in book fairs and exhibitions predominantly in Europe and North America, and has been at the heart of a number of shows heralding a new age of photography and of artists' self-publishing projects.

ABC has gathered attention for its embracing of print-on-demand technology, an approach that runs counter to traditional offset printing and book publishing models in which artists can incur prohibitive costs.

Current members 

 Claudia de la Torre
 Arnaud Desjardin
 Oliver Griffin
 George Grace Gibson
 Mishka Henner
 Jonathan Lewis
 John Maclean
 MacDonaldStrand
 Micheál O'Connell / Mocksim
 Monika Orpik
 Louis Porter
 Jonathan Schmidt-Ott
 David Schulz
 Travis Shaffer
 Wil Van Iersel
 Duncan Wooldridge
 Rahel Zoller
 Hermann Zschiegner

Past members include: Harvey Benge, Erik Benjamins, Julie Cook, Joshua Deaner, Deanna Dikeman, Eric Doeringer, Fred Free, Kate Glicksberg, Burkhard von Harder, Dawn Kim, Tanja Lazetic, EJ Major, Michael Maranda, Lydia Moyer, Heidi Neilson, Robert Pufleb, Joachim Schmid, Andreas Schmidt, Victor Sira, Paul Soulellis, Katya Stuke & Oliver Sieber, Andrea Stultiens, Elisabeth Tonnard, Corinne Vionnet, Mariken Wessels, Bruno Zhu

Exhibitions 
The multi-volume, collaborative project ABCEUM was included in the 2014 Brighton Photo Biennial (October–November) at Circus Street Market, Brighton. ABC was one of five photography collectives represented.

ABCED, a collaborative work by ABC in honor of Ed Ruscha's 75th birthday, was included in the exhibition Ed Ruscha, Books & Co. at Gagosian Gallery, New York (March–April 2013).

In 2011, a number of artists from the cooperative participated in the From Here On exhibition, curated by ABC founder Joachim Schmid, Martin Parr, Erik Kessels, Joan Fontcuberta and Clément Chéroux at Rencontres d'Arles. Print-on-demand books by ABC members Mishka Henner, Hermann Zschiegner, Andreas Schmidt and Micheál O'Connell/Mocksim (who was not an ABC member at that time) were included. Books by Fred Free, Katja Stuke, Lydia Moyer, Jonathan Lewis, and Travis Shaffer were also on display in the Atelier de mécanique exhibition space.

The cooperative was included in a self-titled exhibition at Printed Matter in New York in June 2011. Over 80 titles were on view by ABC members Andrea Stultiens, Schmidt, Böhm/Kobayashi, Burkhard von Harder, David Schulz, Deanna Dikeman, EJ Major, Elisabeth Tonnard, Erik Benjamins, Fred Free, Harvey Benge, Hermann Zschiegner, Jean Keller, Joachim Schmid, Jochen Friedrich, Jonathan Lewis, Joshua Deaner, Julie Cook, Kate Glicksberg, Lydia Moyer, Mariken Wessels, Michael Maranda, Mishka Henner, Robert Pufleb, T. R. Ericsson, Travis Shaffer, Victor Sira, and Wil van Iersel.

Gallery

References

External links 
 ABC Artists' Books Cooperative

Artist cooperatives
Cooperatives in Germany